William G. Spadea (born March 25, 1969) is an American businessman and television host from New Jersey, who was the Republican nominee for United States Congress in New Jersey's 12th congressional district in 2004. He was Chairman of the College Republican National Committee (1993–95) and was the host of  Chasing News.  As of December 2015, Spadea has been the morning drive time host on New Jersey 101.5 (WKXW), replacing long time morning personality Jim Gearhart.  In 2021 he started Common Sense Club, which is reported to be the fastest growing conservative social advocacy group in New Jersey. Spadea is thought to be a contender for the 2025 GOP nomination for NJ Governor. In addition to his work at New Jersey 101.5, Spadea, a realtor by trade, is a former Republican congressional candidate who took a hard right turn several years ago and became a loyalist to former President Donald Trump. He’s spread conspiracy theories about the 2020 election and vaccines, and has repeated pro-Russia talking points after its invasion of Ukraine. Spadea also emceed a December event hosted by the New York Young Republicans whose attendees included white nationalists. At that same event, Rep. Marjorie Taylor Greene (R-Ga.) said that if Steve Bannon, another Trump loyalist, had planned the Jan. 6 insurrection at the U.S. Capitol, “we would have won, not to mention we would’ve been armed.”

Background
Spadea graduated from Boston University in 1991. He is a former United States Marine receiving an honorable discharge in 1999.  Spadea served as the elected Chairman of the College Republican National Committee (CRNC). During his term, the Republican National Committee discontinued funding for the College Republicans.

CRNC Chairmanship
Spadea began a nationwide program to register students with the CRNC. The use of the standard form for recruitment of College Republicans started during his term from 1993 through 1995 and helped the CRNC to get a grasp on its total membership. He kept contact with the membership through a national newspaper titled the Broadside, which was delivered to tens of thousands of College Republicans across the country. Spadea assisted the hundreds of youth efforts that changed the course of history by electing a Republican Congress for the first time over 40 years in 1994.

Run for Congress and political follow-up
Running a grassroots campaign that included walking 200 miles to each of 44 towns in the district, he polled over 40% of the vote on election day  and was ranked 17th out of 157 GOP challengers nationwide.

Spadea was successful in raising more money than any other Republican challenger in New Jersey in 2004. He was considered a possible candidate for the United States Senate in 2006. Spadea served as a surrogate speaker for former New York City Mayor and presidential candidate Rudy Giuliani in New Jersey.

In 2012, Spadea ran for the state legislature, running for the 16th District's Assembly seat that was vacant after the death of Assemblyman Peter J. Biondi. In the convention to appoint a replacement, he lost by a three to one margin, earning 52 votes, behind Readington Township Committeewoman Donna Simon with 155 votes.

Spadea lost both of his political campaigns, failing to top 40% of the vote either time.

Positions

In June 2018, Spadea advocated for a state constitutional amendment to revoke the Mount Laurel doctrine, arguing the imposition of unnecessary housing development increased tax burdens unfairly.

Spadea was outspoken and critical of the handling of the pandemic by Governor Murphy in New Jersey, specifically the lockdowns and other mandates.

Vaccine controversy
Spadea has been criticized by some for his on-air advocacy against the need for COVID-19 vaccination and other routine vaccination in New Jersey.

In 2021, Spadea was banned from LinkedIn due to accusations of spreading vaccine misinformation and announced in response he was looking into the possibility of "legal action."

Personal life
From 1999 to 2013, Spadea worked as a corporate vice president for education and career development in the real estate industry for Weichert, Realtors. He lives in Princeton, New Jersey with his wife and their two children.

See also
List of Chairpersons of the College Republicans

References

External links

1969 births
American television journalists
Businesspeople from New Jersey
Boston University alumni
College Republican National Committee chairs
Living people
New Jersey Republicans
Place of birth missing (living people)
People from Princeton, New Jersey
American male journalists